Wavelength-dispersive X-ray spectroscopy (WDXS or WDS) is a non-destructive analysis technique used to obtain elemental information about a range of materials by measuring characteristic x-rays within a small wavelength range. The technique generates a spectrum in which the peaks correspond to specific x-ray lines and elements can be easily identified. WDS is primarily used in chemical analysis, wavelength dispersive X-ray fluorescence (WDXRF) spectrometry, electron microprobes, scanning electron microscopes, and high precision experiments for testing atomic and plasma physics.

Theory 
Wavelength-dispersive X-ray spectroscopy is based on known principles of how the characteristic x-rays are generated by a sample and how the x-rays are measured.

X-ray generation 

X-rays are generated when an electron beam of high enough energy dislodges an electron from an inner orbital within an atom or ion, creating a void. This void is filled when an electron from a higher orbital releases energy and drops down to replace the dislodged electron. The energy difference between the two orbitals is characteristic of the electron configuration of the atom or ion and can be used to identify the atom or ion.

X-ray measurement 
According to Bragg's law, when an X-ray beam of wavelength "λ" strikes the surface of a crystal at an angle "Θ" and the crystal has atomic lattice planes a distance "d" apart, then constructive interference will result in a beam of diffracted x-rays that will be emitted from the crystal at angle "Θ" if
nλ = 2d sin Θ, where n is an integer.

This means that a crystal with a known lattice size will deflect a beam of x-rays from a specific type of sample at a pre-determined angle. The x-ray beam can be measured by placing a detector (usually a scintillation counter or a proportional counter) in the path of the deflected beam and, since each element has a distinctive x-ray wavelength, multiple elements can be determined by having multiple crystals and multiple detectors.

To improve accuracy the x-ray beams are usually collimated by parallel copper blades called a Söller collimator. The single crystal, the specimen, and the detector are mounted precisely on a goniometer with the distance between the specimen and the crystal equal to the distance between the crystal and the detector. It is usually operated under vacuum to reduce the absorption of soft radiation (low-energy photons) by the air and thus increase the sensitivity for the detection and quantification of light elements (between boron and oxygen). The technique generates a spectrum with peaks corresponding to x-ray lines. This is compared with reference spectra to determine the elemental composition of the sample.

As the atomic number of the element increases so there are more possible electrons at different energy levels that can be ejected resulting in x-rays with different wavelengths. This creates spectra with multiple lines, one for each energy level. The largest peak in the spectrum is labelled Kα, the next Kβ, and so on.

Applications 
Applications include analysis of catalysts, cement, food, metals, mining and mineral samples, petroleum, plastics, semiconductors, and wood.

Limitations 
 Analysis is generally limited to a very small area of the sample, although modern automated equipment often use grid patterns for larger analysis areas.
 The technique cannot distinguish between isotopes of elements as the electron configuration of isotopes of an element are identical.
 It cannot measure the valence state of the element, for example Fe2+ vs Fe3+.
 In certain elements, the Kα line might overlap the Kβ of another element and hence if the first element is present, the second element cannot be reliably detected (for example VKα overlaps TiKβ)

See also
 X-ray spectroscopy

References 

Emission spectroscopy
X-ray spectroscopy